The Rice House is a historic house at 501 NW "A" Street in Bentonville, Arkansas.  It is a -story wood-frame structure with elaborate Eastlake (Queen Anne) styling.  Characteristics of the style include jigsaw-cut bracketing, spindled balustrades, and molded panels under the windows.  At the time of its construction in 1890, it was considered one of Bentonville's grandest houses.  The house was listed on the National Register of Historic Places in 1988.

Construction
Once the dream of Charles A. Rice, this home became a reality in 1891 when it was erected. Built to be the family home, Rice spared no expense to make this home a work of art. The floor plan is that of "dog trot" design, being that doors and windows were positioned directly across from each other on all sides of the house. This allowed for natural air flow to cool house in the hot Arkansas summers. Transoms were placed above each interior door, as found in larger buildings of the time, to allow hot air to rise and be moved through rooms and up to second floor, where the hot air would be sucked out in a natural ventilation process. Ornate hand carved wood art, extensive floor, door and window moldings, as well as impressive plaster work was incorporated into the design. Soon into the building process, Rice scaled down the size of the home from its original blue print.  This was done to save on costs and provide for the impressive living areas.

See also
National Register of Historic Places listings in Benton County, Arkansas

References

Houses in Bentonville, Arkansas
Houses completed in 1890
Houses on the National Register of Historic Places in Arkansas
Queen Anne architecture in Arkansas
National Register of Historic Places in Bentonville, Arkansas
1890 establishments in Arkansas
Dogtrot architecture in Arkansas
Stick-Eastlake architecture in the United States